Sir Theodore Fry, 1st Baronet (1 May 1836 – 5 February 1912) was an English businessman and Liberal Party politician who sat in the House of Commons from 1880 to 1895.

Life
He was the son of Francis Fry, of Bristol, and his wife Matilda Penrose, daughter of Daniel Penrose and was educated at Bristol. Fry was active in business in the North East, as director of the Bearpark Coal and Coke Co; director of Shildon and Weardale Waterworks, and head of Fry Janson and Co, iron manufacturers of Darlington. He was mayor of Darlington 1877–1878.

At the 1880 general election Fry was elected  Member of Parliament (MP) for Darlington, and held the seat until the 1895 general election. He was made a baronet, of Woodburn in the parish of Blackwell in the County of Durham, in 1894.

Fry died at the age of 76 at his residence, Beechhanger Court, Caterham.

Family
Fry married Sophia Pease (1837–1897), a philanthropist and political activist and granddaughter of the railway pioneer Edward Pease. After her death, he married Florence Bates in 1902.

References

External links 
 
Photograph of Sir Theodore Fry, Bt

1836 births
1912 deaths
Liberal Party (UK) MPs for English constituencies
Baronets in the Baronetage of the United Kingdom
UK MPs 1880–1885
UK MPs 1885–1886
UK MPs 1886–1892
UK MPs 1892–1895